Anglo-Turkish War may refer to:

 Anglo-Turkish War (1807–09), part of the Napoleonic Wars
 Middle Eastern theatre of World War I (1914–18), where Britain and Turkey fought on several fronts
 Turkish War of Independence (1919–23), where Britain and allies fought the Turkish National Movement